Anthocercis littorea, also known as yellow tailflower, is a species of shrub in the family Solanaceae. It's native to  Western Australia where it grows on coastal limestone and dunes as well as sandplains.

Description
It usually grows to between 0.6 and 3 metres in height and produces yellow flowers throughout the year in its native range.

The species was first formally described by French naturalist Jacques Labillardière in 1806 in Novae Hollandiae Plantarum Specimen.

References

Nicotianoideae
Solanales of Australia
Eudicots of Western Australia
Plants described in 1806